Min Wae Aung (born 1960) is an international contemporary artist from Myanmar whose realistic work is characterized by its strong relationship to Burmese culture and Buddhist philosophy. He is the
owner of New Treasure Art Gallery in Yangon's Golden Valley.

Biography
Min Wae Aung was born in 1960 in Danubyu, Ayeyarwady Region. He lives with his wife, Than Than, and their two teenage sons in Yangon. He studied at the State School of Fine Arts in Yangon.

References

Living people
1960 births
Burmese painters
Burmese performance artists
People from Ayeyarwady Region